Joseph Maria Koudelka (December 7, 1852 – June 24, 1921) was a Czech-born prelate of the Roman Catholic Church who served as the second bishop of the Diocese of Superior in Wisconsin from 1913 until his death in 1921.

Koudelka previously served as an auxiliary bishop of the Diocese of Cleveland in Ohio from 1908 to 1911 and as an auxiliary bishop of the Archdiocese of Milwaukee in Wisconsin from 1911 to 1913.

Biography

Early life 
Joseph Koudelka was born on December, 7, 1852 to Markus and Anna Jonoushek Koudelka at Chlistov, Bohemia in the Austrian Empire. He attended college at Klatovy in Bohemia. In 1868, his family emigrated to the United States. In preparation for the priesthood, Koudelka attended St. Francis Seminary in Milwaukee, Wisconsin.

Priesthood 
Koudelka was ordained to the priesthood for the Diocese of Cleveland on November 29, 1875, by Bishop Tobias Mullen He was ordained under a special dispensation due to a pressing need for a Czech-speaking pastor at St. Procop's Parish in that city.  In 1882, Koudelka was transferred to St. Louis, Missouri, for one year to edit Klas (The Voice), a Czech-language Catholic newspaper. Koudelka returned to Cleveland in 1883 to found St. Michael the Archangel Parish in that city and serve as its pastor.

Auxiliary Bishop of Cleveland 
On November 29, 1907, Pope Pius X appointed Koudelka as an auxiliary bishop of the Diocese of Cleveland.  He was ordained on February 25, 1908, with a special ministry to the Slavic community.

Auxiliary Bishop of Milwaukee 
On June 24, 1911 Pius X appointed Koudelka as the first auxiliary bishop of the Archdiocese of Milwaukee. He was ordained on September 4, 1911. In a 1912 trip to Rome, Koudelka had a private meeting with the pope.

Bishop of Superior
On August 6, 1913, Pope Pius X appointed Koudelka the second bishop of the Diocese of Superior. He was installed at the pro-cathedral of Sacred Heart in Superior, Wisconsin by Archbishop Sebastian Messmer

In 1912, Koudelka ordained Philip B. Gordon, the first Ojibwa priest and the second Native American Catholic priest in the country. Fluent in eight languages, Koudelka authored books in Czech, German and English. As bishop, he also learned to speak the Ojibwe language.   He commissioned works of art for several church properties.

Koudelka created the Catholic Charities Bureau in Superior. On September 12, 1917 he dedicated St. Joseph's Children's Home in Superior, an orphanage that housed up to 200 children. He conducted over 100 parish missions around the country and contributed donations to help finance the orphanage.

In 1918, during World War I, the US Department of Justice (DOJ) investigated Koudelka - some priests had accused him of being pro-German.  Two DOJ investigators interviewed him in Superior.  After speaking with Koudelka and viewing some of his writings that supported US involvement in the war, the investigators concluded that these suspicions were groundless.

Death and legacy 
Joseph Koudelka died on June 24, 1921 at his residence in Superior. The funeral Mass was celebrated at the chapel of St. Joseph's Children's Home by his nephew Reverend Charles Koudelka of Cleveland. The next day, a solemn burial Mass was held at Sacred Heart pro-cathedral. Final services were at St. Michael Church in Cleveland where he was pastor with burial at St. Mary Cemetery.

See also

 Catholic Church hierarchy
 Catholic Church in the United States
 Historical list of the Catholic bishops of the United States
 List of Catholic bishops of the United States
 Lists of patriarchs, archbishops, and bishops

References

External links
 GCatholic Reference, Diocese of Cleveland, former prelates 
 GCatholic Reference, Diocese of Superior, list of Bishops 

1852 births
1921 deaths
American people of Bohemian descent
Austro-Hungarian emigrants to the United States
kou
Religious leaders from Cleveland
20th-century Roman Catholic bishops in the United States
Religious leaders from Wisconsin
Roman Catholic Archdiocese of Milwaukee
Catholic Church in Ohio
Roman Catholic Diocese of Cleveland
Roman Catholic bishops of Superior
Roman Catholic Diocese of Superior
St. Francis Seminary (Wisconsin) alumni
American people of Czech descent